Amblycorypha parvipennis, the western round-winged katydid, is a species of phaneropterine katydid in the family Tettigoniidae. It is found in North America.

Subspecies
These two subspecies belong to the species Amblycorypha parvipennis:
 Amblycorypha parvipennis brachyptera Ball, 1897
 Amblycorypha parvipennis parvipennis Stål, 1876

References

Phaneropterinae
Articles created by Qbugbot
Insects described in 1876